Edna Branch Jackson (born September 18, 1944) is an American politician from Georgia. Jackson is a Democratic member of Georgia House of Representatives for District 165. She was previously the Mayor of Savannah from 2012 to 2015, the third African-American, the 2nd female, and the first female African-American to hold the office.

References

African-American state legislators in Georgia (U.S. state)
Democratic Party members of the Georgia House of Representatives
21st-century American politicians
Living people
21st-century African-American politicians
1944 births
African-American mayors in Georgia (U.S. state)
African-American women mayors
21st-century American women politicians